Xavier Mellery (9 August 1845, Laken – 4 February 1921, Brussels) was a Belgian symbolist painter.

The son of a gardener at the Royal Palace of Laeken, Mellery initially worked with the painter-decorator Charles Albert. He attended the Royal Academy of Fine Arts in Brussels from 1860 to 1867, one of his professors being Jean-François Portaels. Mellery won the Prix de Rome and traveled to Italy where he studied paintings from the Renaissance. His works include The Rondo of the Hours.

Mellery designed the statues of all 48 historical professions in the Petit Sablon/Kleine Zavel garden in Brussels, though they were executed by different sculptors. Each pillar has a unique design, as does each section of fence.

Honours
1885: Knight in the Order of Leopold.

References

External links
 Links to his paintings available on-line (Artcyclopedia)

1845 births
1921 deaths
Belgian Symbolist painters
Prix de Rome (Belgium) winners
19th-century Belgian painters
19th-century Belgian male artists
20th-century Belgian painters
Académie Royale des Beaux-Arts alumni
20th-century Belgian male artists